Airside is a controlled part of an airport.

Airside may also refer to:
 Airside (company), a defunct design studio in London
 Airside Retail Park, near Dublin Airport, Ireland